Dieter Below (born 23 June 1942) is a German sailor. He won a bronze medal in the Soling Class with Michael Zachries and Olaf Engelhardt at the 1976 Summer Olympics in Montreal.

References

1942 births
Living people
Sportspeople from Rostock
German male sailors (sport)
Olympic sailors of East Germany
Olympic bronze medalists for East Germany
Olympic medalists in sailing
Sailors at the 1976 Summer Olympics – Soling
Sailors at the 1980 Summer Olympics – Soling
Medalists at the 1976 Summer Olympics
European Champions Soling